Todd Leslie Frain (born January 31, 1962 in Council Bluffs, Iowa) is a former American football tight end in the National Football League for the Washington Redskins and the New England Patriots.  He played college football at the University of Nebraska.

References

1962 births
Living people
American football tight ends
Nebraska Cornhuskers football players
Washington Redskins players
New England Patriots players
Players of American football from Iowa